Bruno Carotti (born 30 September 1972 in Palma de Mallorca, Spain) is a retired French football player. He is currently the sporting director of Montpellier.

Honours
Trophée des Champions: 1998

References

External links

1972 births
Living people
French footballers
France under-21 international footballers
Spanish footballers
French people of Spanish descent
Montpellier HSC players
FC Nantes players
Paris Saint-Germain F.C. players
AS Saint-Étienne players
Toulouse FC players
Ligue 1 players
Ligue 2 players
Spanish emigrants to France
Association football defenders
FC Versailles 78 players
Competitors at the 1993 Mediterranean Games
Mediterranean Games bronze medalists for France
Mediterranean Games medalists in football
Montpellier HSC non-playing staff